Jason Stuart Miyares (born February 11, 1976) is an American attorney and politician serving as the 48th Attorney General of Virginia since January 15, 2022. A Republican, he was elected a member of the Virginia House of Delegates on November 3, 2015, from the 82nd district which encompasses part of Virginia Beach. He was elected Attorney General of Virginia in 2021.

Early life and education 
Miyares was born in Greensboro, North Carolina and attended public schools in Virginia Beach. His mother fled from Cuba in 1965. Miyares earned a Bachelor of Business Administration from James Madison University and a Juris Doctor from College of William & Mary’s Law School. He was Chairman of the Hampton Roads Young Republicans and a founding member of the Hampton Roads Federalist Society. He later served as an assistant commonwealth's attorney in Virginia Beach.

Career 
Miyares worked on George Allen's 2000 Senate campaign. He was later campaign manager and advisor to Republican Scott Rigell in the 2010 and 2012 congressional elections. He was later a partner with the consulting firm Madison Strategies. He also worked at the Virginia Beach law firm Hanger Law until his election to the office of Attorney General.

Virginia House of Delegates 
In 2015, Miyares ran for the Virginia House of Delegates' seat being vacated by Bill DeSteph, who ran successfully for the Virginia State Senate. Unopposed in the June 2015 Republican primary, he defeated Democrat Bill Fleming in the November 2015 general election. He was the first Cuban American elected to the Virginia General Assembly. He was reelected in 2017 and 2019. He served on three committees: General Laws, Courts of Justice, and Transportation. Miyares also served on the Virginia Board of Veterans Services and as Chairman of the Commission on Equal Opportunity for Virginians in Aspiring and Diverse Communities. He was the 2018 and 2019 "Legislator of the Year" by the College of Affordability and Public Trust and 2018 "Legislator of the Year" by the Hampton Roads Military Officers Association. In 2019 he received the "Action Award" by the Safe House Project.

Miyares voted against the Medicaid expansion bill (HB 5001) in the 2018 legislative session.

He endorsed Marco Rubio in the 2016 Republican presidential primaries, and was Rubio's Virginia campaign co-chairman. In 2016, amid the Cuban thaw, Miyares criticized Governor Terry McAuliffe's outreach to Cuba. Miyares introduced a non-binding resolution (H.J. 1777) in 2016 condemning the Boycott, Divestment and Sanctions movement.

Miyares opposes abortion, with exceptions in cases of rape, incest, and protecting the life of the mother. He supports the death penalty, and opposed the decision to abolish capital punishment in Virginia in 2021. In 2020, Miyares opposed legislation to increase the minimum wage in Virginia.

In August 2020, he offered HB 5037, a bill that would grant immunity, except in cases of willful misconduct or gross negligence, to public officials and businesses who followed public health measures to prevent the transmission of COVID-19.

In September 2020, Miyares voted against legislation to authorize local governments to remove Confederate monuments on public property.

Virginia attorney general

Election

In May 2021, Miyares was nominated as the Republican candidate for Virginia Attorney General. He ran against Mark Herring, the incumbent Democratic attorney general, who sought a third term in the November 2021 general election. Miyares was selected at the Virginia Republican Party's "unassembled" convention, in which party delegates cast ranked-choice ballots at polling sites across the state. Miyares defeated three other candidates: Leslie Haley, Chuck Smith, and Jack White. In the final round, Miyares defeated Smith, a hard-right candidate, by a closer-than-expected margin of 52% to 48%.

During his campaign against Herring, Miyares emphasized crime issues. He opposed proposals for the elimination of qualified immunity and declined to take a position on what he would do in the controversial police killing of Bijan Ghaisar. In the November 2021 election, Miyares defeated Herring in a tight race, becoming the first Hispanic and Cuban American to be elected Attorney General of Virginia.

Tenure
Upon taking office, Miyares fired 17 attorneys, and 13 other employees, in the Virginia AG's Office. Those fired included attorneys in the AG's Office of Civil Rights, as well as lawyers working on housing conditions and human trafficking cases.  Miyares also fired the counsel for George Mason University (GMU) and the University of Virginia; the latter was on leave from his UVA position, serving as top investigator for the United States House Select Committee on the January 6 Attack. The firings prompted an acrimonious debate in the state Senate.

Shortly after taking office, Miyares withdrew the Virginia AG Office's brief to the Supreme Court, submitted under his predecessor, supporting a challenge to Mississippi's abortion ban. In his letter to the Supreme Court reversing Virginia's position, Miyares took the stance that there is no constitutional right to obtain an abortion and that Roe v. Wade and Planned Parenthood of Southeastern Pennsylvania v. Casey were wrongly decided.

Miyares issued an advisory opinion in which he concluded that Virginia's public colleges and universities lacked the power to require students to receive the COVID-19 vaccine before enrolling or taking in-person classes. Such advisory opinions are not binding, although at least two institutions (GMU and Virginia Tech) dropped their vaccine requirement after Miyares issued the opinion.

On February 10, 2022, Miyares' deputy attorney general for government operations and transactions resigned when it was reported that she had spread misinformation about the 2020 election and praised the 2021 United States Capitol attack; in her position, she would have overseen matters related to future elections in Virginia. Miyares himself has affirmed that Joe Biden was legitimately elected president and has condemned the attack on the United States Capitol.

Electoral history

Personal life 
Miyares and his wife, Paige (Atkinson) Miyares, have three daughters and live in Virginia Beach, Virginia. His father-in-law, John Atkinson, was formerly treasurer of Virginia Beach. Miyares is a member of the Galilee Episcopal Church and a past President of the Cape Henry Rotary, where he was a Paul Harris Fellow.

References

External links 
 
 

|-

|-

1976 births
21st-century American politicians
American politicians of Cuban descent
Hispanic and Latino American state legislators in Virginia
James Madison University alumni
Living people
Republican Party members of the Virginia House of Delegates
Politicians from Virginia Beach, Virginia
Virginia Attorneys General
William & Mary Law School alumni
Latino conservatism in the United States